John Jamison Moore was an American preacher and educator. 

Moore's achievements include writing a history of the AME Zion Church, establishing the first AME Zion church and school in San Francisco, and advocating for African-American access to education and religion through his newspaper, The Lunar Visitor.

Early life 
Moore was born as a slave in what is today West Virginia. At age 15, he and his mother escaped to Philadelphia to live in freedom.  Moore soon became involved in the  African American Churches in that city. He eventually became a prominent preacher at the AME Zion Church in Philadelphia. 

Moore also traveled to New York City to participate in activities at the AME Zion Church there.  He wrote about this church in his book, The History of The AME Zion Church in America. Founded in 1796 in the City of New York.

Life in San Francisco 
In 1852, Moore moved to San Francisco to further the church in that city.  According to Bishop B.J. Walls, Moore was credited with, 
"Planting the core tenets of freedom, as practiced by his denomination, on the Pacific Coast, in 1852".

In 1852 Moore founded St. Cyprian AME Church, the first AME Zion Church in San Francisco. Around that time, he established a school for African-American children in the church basement, serving as teacher and principal. He created the school because African-American children were barred from public schools in San Francisco. That same year, Moore founded and became head editor of The Lunar Visitor. According to The First AME Zion Church's website, the Lunar Visitor, "promoted civil rights and advocated developing institutions for educational, social and political skills useful in working toward a full participation in American Society,". The newspaper was also "The only African-American magazine in the western part of the country," during the period it was being printed, according to Thomas Segady.

Later life 
Moore later moved to Salisbury, North Carolina, where he married Francis Moore. He died on December 9, 1893, on the train home from a conference in Western North Carolina.  He was buried in Salisbury..

See also 
 African Methodist Episcopal Zion Church

References

External links 
 First AME Zion Church | About Our Founder
 John Jamison Moore, The History of The AME Zion Church in America. Founded in 1796 in the City of New York.

1983 deaths
People from San Francisco
Religious leaders from West Virginia